Phyllodactylus duncanensis is a species of gecko. It is endemic to the Galapagos Islands.

References

Phyllodactylus
Endemic reptiles of the Galápagos Islands
Reptiles described in 1912